Christina Clair Reiss (born September 3, 1962) is a United States district judge of the United States District Court for the District of Vermont. She is the first female judge to serve in the District of Vermont.

Early life and education 
Born in Denver, Reiss moved to Essex Center, Vermont in 1967, where she attended elementary and secondary schools. She earned a Bachelor of Arts degree from Saint Michael's College in Colchester, Vermont in 1984 and a Juris Doctor from the University of Arizona College of Law in 1989.

Professional career 

From 1989 until 1990, Reiss clerked for the Maine Supreme Judicial Court, and from 1990 until 1992, Reiss practiced with the law firm of Perkins, Thompson, Hinckley & Keddy in Portland, Maine. From 1992 until 2001, Reiss practiced law with the firm of Sheehey, Brue, Gray & Furlong in Burlington, Vermont. From 2001 until 2004, Reiss was a partner with the law firm of Gravel and Shea in Burlington.

Judicial career

State judicial career 

In August 2004, Reiss was appointed to the state bench as a district judge.

Federal judicial service 

In July 2009, United States Senator Patrick Leahy announced that he had recommended that Reiss be nominated by President Barack Obama to the United States District Court for the District of Vermont, to fill the seat vacated by Judge John Garvan Murtha, who assumed senior status. On October 9, 2009, Obama announced his intent to nominate Reiss to the district court seat. Her nomination was formally submitted to the United States Senate on October 13, 2009. The United States Senate confirmed Reiss by unanimous consent on November 21, 2009. She received her judicial commission on December 21, 2009. She served as Chief Judge from 2010–2017.

References

External links

1962 births
James E. Rogers College of Law alumni
Judges of the United States District Court for the District of Vermont
Living people
Saint Michael's College alumni
United States district court judges appointed by Barack Obama
21st-century American judges
Vermont state court judges
21st-century American women judges